This is a list of 385 species in Hoplitis, a genus of leafcutter, mason, and resin bees in the family Megachilidae.

Hoplitis species

 Hoplitis abbreviata (Morawitz, 1875) i c g
 Hoplitis abnormis van der Zanden, 1992 i c
 Hoplitis abnormis van-der Zanden, 1992 g
 Hoplitis acanthophora (Morawitz, 1875) i c g
 Hoplitis acuticornis (Dufour & Perris, 1840) i c g
 Hoplitis adunca (Panzer, 1798) i c g
 Hoplitis africana (Warncke, 1990) i c g
 Hoplitis agis (Benoist, 1929) i c g
 Hoplitis ahrensi (Popov, 1962) i c g
 Hoplitis alatauensis (Tkalcu, 1992) i c g
 Hoplitis alba (van der Zanden, 1994) i c g
 Hoplitis albatera Warncke, 1991 g
 Hoplitis albifrons Leach, 1814 i c g b
 Hoplitis albopilosa Wu, 1987 i c g
 Hoplitis alboscopata (Provancher, 1888) i c g
 Hoplitis alchata (Warncke, 1990) i c g
 Hoplitis alexandrina (Warncke, 1991) i c g
 Hoplitis anipuncta (Alfken, 1935) i c g
 Hoplitis annulata (Latreille, 1811) i c g
 Hoplitis anonyma (Cameron, 1904) i c g
 Hoplitis antalyae Tkalcu, 2000 i c g
 Hoplitis antennata (Morawitz, 1876) i c g
 Hoplitis anthocopoides (Schenck, 1853) i c g b
 Hoplitis antigae (Pérez, 1895) i c g
 Hoplitis aqabaensis (Warncke, 1991) i c g
 Hoplitis arabiae Muller g
 Hoplitis aravensis Zanden, 1992 g
 Hoplitis arenivaga van der Zanden, 1996 i c
 Hoplitis arenivaga van-der Zanden, 1996 g
 Hoplitis aristotelis (Warncke, 1990) i c g
 Hoplitis askhabadensis (Radoszkowski, 1886) i c g
 Hoplitis ayardi (Benoist, 1929) i c g
 Hoplitis barbigera (Benoist, 1951) i c g
 Hoplitis basingeri (Timberlake & Michener, 1950) i c g
 Hoplitis bassana (Warncke, 1991) i c g
 Hoplitis batyamae (van der Zanden, 1986) i c g
 Hoplitis beijingensis Wu, 1987 i c g
 Hoplitis benoisti (Alfken, 1935) i c g
 Hoplitis bicallosa (Morawitz, 1876) i c g
 Hoplitis bidenticauda (Timberlake & Michener, 1950) i c g
 Hoplitis bifoveolata (Alfken, 1935) i c g
 Hoplitis bihamata (Costa, 1885) i c g
 Hoplitis bilobulata Wu, 1992 i c g
 Hoplitis bipartita (Friese, 1899) i c g
 Hoplitis biscutellae Cockerell, 1897 i c g b
 Hoplitis bispinosa van der Zanden, 1992 i c
 Hoplitis bispinosa van-der Zanden, 1992 g
 Hoplitis bisulca (Gerstäcker, 1869) i c g
 Hoplitis boharti (Timberlake & Michener, 1950) i c g
 Hoplitis bombiformis van der Zanden, 1991 i c g
 Hoplitis bombiformis van-der Zanden, 1991 g
 Hoplitis brachyodonta (Cockerell, 1933) i c g
 Hoplitis brachypogon (Pérez, 1879) i c g
 Hoplitis brevicornis (Morawitz, 1880) i c g
 Hoplitis brevifurca (Benoist, 1934) i c g
 Hoplitis brevispina (Tkalcu, 2000) i c g
 Hoplitis brevispora (Warncke, 1992) i c g
 Hoplitis brunnescens (Benoist, 1950) i c g
 Hoplitis bubulca (van der Zanden, 1994) i c g
 Hoplitis bullifacies Michener, 1947 i c g b
 Hoplitis bunocephala Michener, 1947 i c g b
 Hoplitis bytinskii (Mavromoustakis, 1948) i c
 Hoplitis cadiza (Warncke, 1991) i c g
 Hoplitis camelina (Benoist, 1934) i c g
 Hoplitis campanularis (Morawitz, 1878) i c g
 Hoplitis capsulifer Popov, 1960 i c g
 Hoplitis carinata (Stanek, 1969) i c g
 Hoplitis carinotarsa Wu, 1987 i c g
 Hoplitis cathena (Cameron, 1904) i c g
 Hoplitis caucasica (Friese, 1920) i c g
 Hoplitis caucasicola  g
 Hoplitis caudex (Timberlake & Michener, 1950) i c g
 Hoplitis caularis (Morawitz, 1875) i c g
 Hoplitis cercomela (Warncke, 1991) i c g
 Hoplitis christae (Warncke, 1991) i c g
 Hoplitis chukar (Warncke, 1991) i c g
 Hoplitis ciliaris (Pérez, 1902) i c g
 Hoplitis claviventris (Thomson, 1872) i c g
 Hoplitis colei (Crawford, 1916) i c g
 Hoplitis conchophila Kuhlmann, 2011 g
 Hoplitis conosimilis van der Zanden, 1992 i c
 Hoplitis conosimilis van-der Zanden, 1992 g
 Hoplitis contracta (Walker, 1871) i c g
 Hoplitis corniculatus van-der Zanden, 1989 g
 Hoplitis crassipunctata Muller g
 Hoplitis cretaea (Tkalcu, 1992) i c g
 Hoplitis cristatula (van der Zanden, 1990) i c g
 Hoplitis cryptanthae (Timberlake & Michener, 1950) i c g
 Hoplitis ctenophora (Benoist, 1934) i c g
 Hoplitis curtula (Pérez, 1895) i c g
 Hoplitis curvipes (Morawitz, 1871) i c g
 Hoplitis cypriaca (Mavromoustakis, 1938) i c g
 Hoplitis dalmatica (Morawitz, 1871) i c g
 Hoplitis daniana (Mavromoustakis, 1949) i c g
 Hoplitis daurica (Radoszkowski, 1887) i c g
 Hoplitis decaocta (Warncke, 1991) i c g
 Hoplitis denudata (Morawitz, 1880) i c g
 Hoplitis deserticola (Timberlake & Michener, 1950) i c g
 Hoplitis desertorum Muller g
 Hoplitis diabolica (Benoist, 1934) i c g
 Hoplitis dispersipunctata Muller g
 Hoplitis dorni Tkalcu, 1995 i c g
 Hoplitis duckeana (Kohl, 1905) i c g
 Hoplitis dumonti (Benoist, 1929) i c g
 Hoplitis eburnea (Warncke, 1991) i c g
 Hoplitis elaziga (Warncke, 1991) i c g
 Hoplitis elongaticeps Michener, 1947 i c g b
 Hoplitis emarginata (Griswold, 1983) i c g
 Hoplitis enslini (Alfken, 1935) i c g
 Hoplitis epeoliformis (Ducke, 1899) i c g
 Hoplitis eremophila (Warncke, 1991) i c g
 Hoplitis erythrogastra (Mavromoustakis, 1954) i c g
 Hoplitis erzurumensis Tkalcu, 2000 i c g
 Hoplitis evansi (Michener, 1936) i c g
 Hoplitis excisa (Morawitz, 1880) i c g
 Hoplitis fabrei van der Zanden, 1987 i c
 Hoplitis fabrei van-der Zanden, 1987 g
 Hoplitis farabensis (Popov, 1962) i c g
 Hoplitis fascicularia (Radoszkowski, 1886) i c g
 Hoplitis fasciculata (Alfken, 1934) g
 Hoplitis ferianaensis (van der Zanden, 1991) i c g
 Hoplitis fertoni (Pérez, 1891) i c g
 Hoplitis flabellifera (Morice, 1901) i c g
 Hoplitis fortispina (Pérez, 1895) i c g
 Hoplitis fossulata (Mocsáry, 1883) i c g
 Hoplitis freygessneri (Friese, 1899) i c g
 Hoplitis fulgida Cronquist i c g b
 Hoplitis fulica (Warncke, 1991) i c g
 Hoplitis fulva (Eversmann, 1852) i c g
 Hoplitis furcula (Morawitz, 1875) i c g
 Hoplitis galbula (Warncke, 1991) i c g
 Hoplitis galichicae Muller g
 Hoplitis gallinula (Warncke, 1991) i c g
 Hoplitis garzetta (Warncke, 1991) i c g
 Hoplitis gentilis (Warncke, 1991) i c g
 Hoplitis gerofita (Warncke, 1990) i c g
 Hoplitis glasunovi (Morawitz, 1894) i c g
 Hoplitis gleasoni (Titus, 1904) i c g
 Hoplitis gobiensis Muller g
 Hoplitis goulemina (Warncke, 1991) i c g
 Hoplitis graeca (Tkalcu, 2000) i c g
 Hoplitis grandiscapa (Pérez, 1895) i c g
 Hoplitis grinnelli (Cockerell, 1910) i c g
 Hoplitis grossepunctata (Kohl, 1905) i c g
 Hoplitis grumi (Morawitz, 1894) i c g
 Hoplitis gusenleitneri (Warncke, 1991) i c g
 Hoplitis haemi Tkalcu, 2000 i c g
 Hoplitis hamulicornis (Timberlake & Michener, 1950) i c g
 Hoplitis heilungjiangensis Wu, 1987 i c g
 Hoplitis heinrichi van der Zanden, 1980 i c g
 Hoplitis heinrichi van-der Zanden, 1980 g
 Hoplitis helouanensis (Friese, 1899) i c g
 Hoplitis hemisphaerica (Alfken, 1935) i c g
 Hoplitis hierichonica (Mavromoustakis, 1949) i c g
 Hoplitis hilbera  g
 Hoplitis hofferi Tkalcu, 1977 i c g
 Hoplitis hoggara (Warncke, 1992) i c g
 Hoplitis holmboei (Mavromoustakis, 1948) i c g
 Hoplitis homalocera van der Zanden, 1991 i c
 Hoplitis homalocera van-der Zanden, 1991 g
 Hoplitis howardi (Cockerell, 1910) i c g
 Hoplitis hyperplastica (Morawitz, 1894) i c g
 Hoplitis hypocrita (A. Massal.) Fröberg, 1989 i c g b
 Hoplitis idaensis (Warncke, 1991) i c g
 Hoplitis idalia (Mavromoustakis, 1948) i c g
 Hoplitis ilamana (van der Zanden, 1994) i c g
 Hoplitis illustris van der Zanden, 1992 i c g
 Hoplitis illustris van-der Zanden, 1992 g
 Hoplitis illyrica (Noskiewicz, 1926) i c g
 Hoplitis imperfecta (Provancher, 1896) i c g
 Hoplitis improceros van der Zanden, 1998 i c
 Hoplitis improceros van-der Zanden, 1998 g
 Hoplitis incanescens (Cockerell, 1922) i c g b
 Hoplitis incognita van der Zanden, 1996 i c
 Hoplitis incognita van-der Zanden, 1996 g
 Hoplitis inconspicua Tkalcu, 1995 i c g
 Hoplitis indostana (Cameron, 1904) i c g
 Hoplitis infrapicta (Cockerell, 1916) i c g
 Hoplitis insolita (Benoist, 1928) i c g
 Hoplitis insularis (Schmiedeknecht, 1885) i c g
 Hoplitis irania (Warncke, 1991) i c g
 Hoplitis israelica (Warncke, 1991) i c g
 Hoplitis jacintana (Cockerell, 1910) i c g
 Hoplitis jakovlevi (Radoszkowski, 1874) i c g
 Hoplitis jejuna Popov, 1952 i c g
 Hoplitis jerichoensis (van der Zanden, 1996) i c g
 Hoplitis jheringii (Ducke, 1898) i c g
 Hoplitis karakalensis (Popov, 1936) i c g
 Hoplitis karikalensis (Peters, 1972) i c g
 Hoplitis kaszabi Tkalcu, 2000 i c g
 Hoplitis kotschisa Warncke, 1991 g
 Hoplitis laboriosa (Smith, 1878) i c
 Hoplitis laevibullata (Michener, 1943) i c g
 Hoplitis laevifrons (Morawitz, 1872) i c g
 Hoplitis laeviscutum (Alfken, 1935) i c g
 Hoplitis lamina (Pérez, 1895) i c g
 Hoplitis laminifera Popov, 1960 i c g
 Hoplitis lapidaria (Morawitz, 1878) i c g
 Hoplitis latifemoralis (Wu, 1985) i c g
 Hoplitis latuspilosa van der Zanden, 1992 i c
 Hoplitis latuspilosa van-der Zanden, 1992 g
 Hoplitis lebanotica (Mavromoustakis, 1955) i c g
 Hoplitis lecerfi (Benoist, 1929) i c g
 Hoplitis lefeberi van der Zanden, 1991 i c
 Hoplitis lefeberi van-der Zanden, 1991 g
 Hoplitis leiocephala (Mavromoustakis, 1954) i c g
 Hoplitis lepeletieri (Pérez, 1879) i c g
 Hoplitis leucomelana (Kirby, 1802) i c g
 Hoplitis libanensis (Morice, 1901) i c g
 Hoplitis limassolica (Mavromoustakis, 1937) i c g
 Hoplitis linguaria (Morawitz, 1876) i c g
 Hoplitis linsdalei Michener, 1947 i c g
 Hoplitis lithodorae Müller, 2012 g
 Hoplitis loboclypeata Wu, 1990 i c g
 Hoplitis longispina (Pérez, 1895) i c g
 Hoplitis loreicornis (Benoist, 1934) i c g
 Hoplitis loti (Morawitz, 1867) i c g
 Hoplitis louisae (Cockerell, 1934) i c
 Hoplitis lucidula (Benoist, 1934) i c g
 Hoplitis lysholmi (Friese, 1899) i c g
 Hoplitis maghrebensis (van der Zanden, 1992) i c g
 Hoplitis malyshevi (Popov, 1963) i c g
 Hoplitis manicata (Morice, 1901) i c g
 Hoplitis manuelae  g
 Hoplitis marchali (Pérez, 1902) i c g
 Hoplitis maritima (Romankova, 1985) i c g
 Hoplitis maroccana (van der Zanden, 1998) i c g
 Hoplitis matheranensis (Michener, 1966) i c g
 Hoplitis mazzuccoi (Schwarz & Gusenleitner, 2005) i c g
 Hoplitis meyeri (Benoist, 1934) i c g
 Hoplitis micheneri Mitchell, 1962 i c g
 Hoplitis minor (Morawitz, 1878) i c g
 Hoplitis minuta Wu, 1990 i c g
 Hoplitis mitis (Nylander, 1852) i c g
 Hoplitis mocsaryi (Friese, 1895) i c g
 Hoplitis mojavensis Michener, 1947 i c g
 Hoplitis mollis Tkalcu, 2000 i c g
 Hoplitis mongolica Wu, 1990 i c g
 Hoplitis monstrabilis Tkalcu, 2000 i c g
 Hoplitis monticola  g
 Hoplitis moricei (Friese, 1899) i c g
 Hoplitis morinella (Warncke, 1991) i c g
 Hoplitis mucida (Dours, 1873) i c g
 Hoplitis murina (Tkalcu, 1992) i c g
 Hoplitis mutica (Warncke, 1991) i c g
 Hoplitis nanula (Timberlake & Michener, 1950) i c g
 Hoplitis nasoincisa (Ferton, 1914) i c g
 Hoplitis neavei (Cockerell, 1936) i c g
 Hoplitis negevensis (Warncke, 1991) i c g
 Hoplitis nicolaei  g
 Hoplitis nigrella (Michener, 1954) i c g
 Hoplitis nigrocolor (van der Zanden, 1991) i c g
 Hoplitis nisa (Warncke, 1991) i c g
 Hoplitis nitidula (Morawitz, 1878) i c g
 Hoplitis obtusa (Friese, 1899) i c g
 Hoplitis occidentalis Müller, 2012 g
 Hoplitis ochraceicornis (Ferton, 1902) i c g
 Hoplitis ochruros (Warncke, 1991) i c g
 Hoplitis onychophora (Mavromoustakis, 1939) i c g
 Hoplitis oreades (Benoist, 1934) i c g
 Hoplitis orthodonta (Cockerell, 1932) i c g
 Hoplitis orthognatha (Griswold, 1983) i c g
 Hoplitis oxypyga (Benoist, 1927) i c g
 Hoplitis ozbeki Tkalcu, 2000 i c g
 Hoplitis paiute (Griswold, 1983) i c g
 Hoplitis pallicornis (Friese, 1895) i c g
 Hoplitis palmarum (Cockerell, 1935) i c g
 Hoplitis papaveris (Latreille, 1799) i c g
 Hoplitis paralias (Mavromoustakis, 1954) i c g
 Hoplitis parana (Warncke, 1991) i c g
 Hoplitis parasitica (Warncke, 1991) i c g
 Hoplitis parnesica (Mavromoustakis, 1958) i c g
 Hoplitis paroselae Michener, 1947 i c g
 Hoplitis peniculifera  g
 Hoplitis peralba van der Zanden, 1992 i c
 Hoplitis peralba van-der Zanden, 1992 g
 Hoplitis perezi (Ferton, 1895) i c g
 Hoplitis persica (Warncke, 1991) i c g
 Hoplitis pici (Friese, 1899) i c g
 Hoplitis picicornis (Morawitz, 1895) i c g
 Hoplitis pilosifrons (Cresson, 1864) i c g
 Hoplitis pinkeunia (Warncke, 1991) i c g
 Hoplitis pisidiae Tkalcu, 2000 i c g
 Hoplitis plagiostoma Michener, 1947 i c g
 Hoplitis platalea (Warncke, 1990) i c g
 Hoplitis pomarina (Warncke, 1991) i c g
 Hoplitis popovi Wu, 2004 i c g
 Hoplitis praestans (Morawitz, 1893) i c g
 Hoplitis premordica Griswold, 1998 i c g
 Hoplitis princeps (Morawitz, 1872) i c g
 Hoplitis procerior (Tkalcu, 2000) i c g
 Hoplitis producta (Cresson, 1864) i c b
 Hoplitis pulchella (Pérez, 1895) i c g
 Hoplitis pungens (Benoist, 1929) i c g
 Hoplitis pygmaea (Timberlake & Michener, 1950) i c g
 Hoplitis pyrrhosoma Wu, 1990 i c g
 Hoplitis quadrispina (Tkalcu, 1992) i c g
 Hoplitis quarzazati (van der Zanden, 1998) i c g
 Hoplitis quettensis Tkalcu, 2000 i c g
 Hoplitis quinquespinosa (Friese, 1899) i c g
 Hoplitis ravouxi (Pérez, 1902) i c g
 Hoplitis recticauda (Stanek, 1969) i c g
 Hoplitis reducta (Timberlake & Michener, 1950) i c g
 Hoplitis remotula (Cockerell, 1910) i c g
 Hoplitis ridibunda (Warncke, 1991) i c g
 Hoplitis robusta (Nylander, 1848) i c g
 Hoplitis rubricrus (Friese, 1899) i c g
 Hoplitis ruficornis (Morawitz, 1875) i c
 Hoplitis ruficrus (Morawitz, 1875) i c g
 Hoplitis rufimana (Morawitz, 1875) i c g
 Hoplitis rufoantennalis Wu, 2004 i c g
 Hoplitis rufopicta (Morawitz, 1875) i c g
 Hoplitis rugidorsis (Pérez, 1895) i c g
 Hoplitis samarkanda (Warncke, 1991) i c g
 Hoplitis sambuci Titus, 1904 i c g
 Hoplitis saundersi (Vachal, 1891) i c g
 Hoplitis saxialis (van der Zanden, 1994) i c g
 Hoplitis scita (Eversmann, 1852) i c g
 Hoplitis segura (Warncke, 1991) i c g
 Hoplitis semilinguaria Tkalcu, 1992 i c g
 Hoplitis seminigra (Timberlake & Michener, 1950) i c g
 Hoplitis semirubra (Cockerell, 1898) i c g
 Hoplitis serainae  g
 Hoplitis shoshone (Parker, 1976) i c g
 Hoplitis sichuanensis Wu, 1992 i c g
 Hoplitis significans Tkalcu, 1995 i c g
 Hoplitis similis (Timberlake & Michener, 1950) i c g
 Hoplitis simplex (Cresson, 1864) i c g
 Hoplitis simplicata (Warncke, 1991) i c g
 Hoplitis simplicicornis (Morawitz, 1875) i c g
 Hoplitis simula (Gribodo, 1894) i c g
 Hoplitis singularis (Morawitz, 1875) i c g
 Hoplitis sinuata (Pérez, 1895) i c g
 Hoplitis sordida (Benoist, 1929) i c g
 Hoplitis speculum (Benoist, 1934) i c g
 Hoplitis speculumoides van der Zanden, 1991 i c
 Hoplitis speculumoides van-der Zanden, 1991 g
 Hoplitis spoliata (Provancher, 1888) i c g b
 Hoplitis stellaris (Warncke, 1991) i c g
 Hoplitis strepera (Warncke, 1991) i c g
 Hoplitis strymonia Tkalcu, 1999 i c g
 Hoplitis subbutea (Warncke, 1991) i c g
 Hoplitis submanicata van der Zanden, 1984 i c
 Hoplitis submanicata van-der Zanden, 1984 g
 Hoplitis subulicornis (Morawitz, 1878) i c g
 Hoplitis taenioceras (Benoist, 1927) i c g
 Hoplitis taurimordax (Peters, 1983) i c g
 Hoplitis tenuicornis (Morawitz, 1875) i c g
 Hoplitis tenuiserrata (Benoist, 1950) i c g
 Hoplitis tenuispina (Alfken, 1937) i c g
 Hoplitis testaceozonata (Alfken, 1935) i c g
 Hoplitis teucrii (Benoist, 1927) i c g
 Hoplitis tibetensis Wu, 1987 i c g
 Hoplitis tigrina (Morawitz, 1872) i c g
 Hoplitis tkalcuella Le Goff, 2003 i c g
 Hoplitis torchioi (Parker, 1979) i c g
 Hoplitis tricolor (Saunders, 1908) i c g
 Hoplitis tridentata (Dufour & Perris, 1840) i c g
 Hoplitis tringa (Warncke, 1991) i c g
 Hoplitis tristis (Michener, 1936) i c g
 Hoplitis truicauda (Timberlake & Michener, 1950) i c g
 Hoplitis truncata (Cresson, 1878) i c g
 Hoplitis tuberculata (Nylander, 1848) i c g
 Hoplitis tunica (Warncke, 1991) i c g
 Hoplitis ulaangomensis (Tkalcu, 1995) i c g
 Hoplitis uncaticornis (Stanek, 1969) i c g
 Hoplitis unispina (Alfken, 1935) i c g
 Hoplitis urfensis (van der Zanden, 1984) i c g
 Hoplitis ursina (Friese, 1920) i c g
 Hoplitis uvulalis (Cockerell, 1902) i c g
 Hoplitis verhoeffi (Mavromoustakis, 1954) i c g
 Hoplitis verruciventris (Morawitz, 1886) i c g
 Hoplitis villiersi (Benoist, 1950) i c g
 Hoplitis villosa (Schenck, 1853) i c
 Hoplitis viridimicans (Cockerell, 1897) i c g
 Hoplitis wadicola (Alfken, 1935) i c g
 Hoplitis wahrmani (Mavromoustakis, 1948) i c g
 Hoplitis xanthoprymna (Warncke, 1991) i c g
 Hoplitis xerophila (Cockerell, 1935) i c g
 Hoplitis xinjiangensis Wu, 1987 i c g
 Hoplitis yermasoyiae (Mavromoustakis, 1938) i c g
 Hoplitis zaianorum (Benoist, 1927) i c g
 Hoplitis zandeni (Teunissen & van Achterberg, 1992) i c g
 Hoplitis zonalis (Pérez, 1895) i c g
 Hoplitis zuni (Parker, 1977) i c g

Data sources: i = ITIS, c = Catalogue of Life, g = GBIF, b = Bugguide.net

References

Hoplitis
Articles created by Qbugbot